Torture is the deliberate infliction of severe pain or suffering on a person for reasons such as punishment, extracting a confession, interrogation for information, or intimidating third parties. Some definitions are restricted to acts carried out by the state, but others include non-state organizations.

Torture has been carried out since ancient times. In the eighteenth and nineteenth centuries, Western countries abolished the official use of torture in the judicial system, but torture continued to be used throughout the world. A variety of methods of torture are used, often in combination; the most common form of physical torture is beatings. Since the twentieth century, many torturers have preferred non-scarring or psychological methods to provide deniability. Torturers are enabled by organizations that facilitate and encourage their behavior. Most victims of torture are poor and marginalized people suspected of crimes, although torture against political prisoners or during armed conflict has received disproportionate attention. Judicial corporal punishment and capital punishment are sometimes seen as forms of torture, but this label is internationally controversial.

Torture aims to break the victim's will and destroy their agency and personality. It is one of the most damaging experiences that a person can undergo and can also negatively affect perpetrating individuals and institutions. Public opinion research has shown general opposition to torture. Torture is prohibited under international law for all states under all circumstances and is explicitly forbidden by several treaties. Opposition to torture stimulated the formation of the human rights movement after World War II, and torture continues to be an important human rights issue. Although its incidence has declined, torture is still practiced by some countries.

Definitions

Torture is defined as the deliberate infliction of severe pain or suffering on someone under the control of the perpetrator. The treatment must be inflicted for a specific purpose, such as punishment and forcing the victim to confess or provide information. The definition put forth by the United Nations Convention against Torture only considers torture carried out by the state. Most legal systems include agents acting on behalf of the state, and some definitions add non-state armed groups, organized crime, or private individuals working in state-monitored facilities (such as hospitals). The most expansive definitions encompass anyone as a potential perpetrator. The severity threshold at which treatment can be classified as torture is the most controversial aspect of its definition; the interpretation of torture has broadened over time. Another approach, preferred by scholars such as Manfred Nowak and Malcolm Evans, distinguishes torture from other forms of cruel, inhuman, or degrading treatment by considering only the torturer's purpose, and not the severity. Other definitions, such as that in the Inter-American Convention to Prevent and Punish Torture, focus on the torturer's aim "to obliterate the personality of the victim".

History

Pre-abolition

In most ancient, medieval, and early modern societies, torture was legally and morally acceptable. There is archaeological evidence of torture in Early Neolithic Europe, about 7,000 years ago. Torture is commonly mentioned in historical sources on Assyria and Achaemenid Persia. Societies used torture both as part of the judicial process and as punishment, although some historians make a distinction between torture and painful punishments. Historically, torture was seen as a reliable way to elicit the truth, a suitable punishment, and deterrence against future offenses. When torture was legally regulated, there were restrictions on the allowable methods; common methods in Europe included the rack and strappado. In most societies, citizens could be judicially tortured only under exceptional circumstances and for a serious crime such as treason, often only when some evidence already existed. In contrast, non-citizens such as foreigners and slaves were commonly tortured.

Torture was rare in early medieval Europe but became more common between 1200 and 1400. Because medieval judges used an exceptionally high standard of proof, they would sometimes authorize torture when circumstantial evidence tied a person to a capital crime, if there were fewer than the two eyewitnesses required to convict someone in the absence of a confession. Torture was still a labor-intensive process reserved for the most serious crimes; most torture victims were men accused of murder, treason, or theft. Medieval ecclesiastical courts and the Inquisition used torture under the same procedural rules as secular courts. The Ottoman Empire and Qajar Iran used torture in cases where circumstantial evidence tied someone to a crime, although Islamic law has traditionally considered evidence obtained under torture to be inadmissible.

Abolition and continued use

During the seventeenth century, torture remained legal in Europe, but its practice declined. Torture was already of marginal importance to European criminal justice systems by its formal abolition in the 18th and early 19th centuries. Theories for why torture was abolished include the rise of Enlightenment ideas about the value of the human person, the lowering of the standard of proof in criminal cases, popular views that no longer saw pain as morally redemptive, and the expansion of imprisonment as an alternative to executions or painful punishments. It is not known if torture also declined in non-Western states or in European colonies during the nineteenth century. In China, judicial torture, which had been practiced for more than two millennia, was banned in 1905 along with flogging and lingchi (dismemberment) as a means of execution, although torture in China continued throughout the twentieth and twenty-first centuries.

Torture was widely used by colonial powers to subdue resistance and reached a peak during the anti-colonial wars in the twentieth century. An estimated 300,000 people were tortured during the Algerian War of Independence (1954–1962), and the United Kingdom and Portugal also used torture in attempts to retain their respective empires. Independent states in Africa, the Middle East, and Asia often used torture in the twentieth century, but it is unknown whether their use of torture increased or decreased compared to nineteenth-century levels. During the first half of the twentieth century, torture became more prevalent in Europe with the advent of secret police, World War I and World War II, and the rise of communist and fascist states.

Torture was also used by both communist and anti-communist governments during the Cold War in Latin America, with an estimated 100,000 to 150,000 victims of torture by United States–backed regimes. The only countries in which torture was rare during the twentieth century were the liberal democracies of the West, but torture was still used there, against ethnic minorities or criminal suspects from marginalized classes, and during overseas wars against foreign populations. After the September 11 attacks, the US government embarked on an overseas torture program as part of its war on terror.

Prevalence

Most countries practice torture, although few acknowledge it. The international prohibition of torture has not completely stopped torture; instead, states have changed which techniques are used and denied, covered up, or outsourced torture programs. Measuring the rate at which torture occurs is difficult because it is typically committed in secrecy, and abuses are likelier to come to light in open societies where there is a commitment to protecting human rights. Many torture survivors, especially those from poor or marginalized populations, are unwilling to report. Monitoring has focused on police stations and prisons, although torture can also occur in other facilities such as immigration detention and youth detention centers. Torture that occurs outside of custody—including extrajudicial punishment, intimidation, and crowd control—has traditionally not been counted, even though some studies have suggested it is more common than torture in places of detention. There is even less information on the prevalence of torture before the twentieth century. Although some studies have found that men are more likely to face torture than women, other studies have found that both suffer torture at equal rates.

Although liberal democracies are less likely to abuse their citizens, they may practice torture against marginalized citizens and non-citizens to whom they are not democratically accountable. Voters may support violence against out-groups seen as threatening; majoritarian institutions are ineffective at preventing torture against minorities or foreigners. Torture is more likely when a society feels threatened because of wars or crises, but studies have not found a consistent relationship between the use of torture and terrorist attacks.

Torture is directed against certain segments of the population, who are denied the protection against torture that others enjoy. Torture of political prisoners and torture during armed conflicts receive more attention compared to torture of the poor or criminal suspects. Most victims of torture are suspected of crimes; a disproportionate number of victims are from poor or marginalized communities. Groups especially vulnerable to torture include unemployed young men, the urban poor, LGBT people, refugees and migrants, ethnic and racial minorities, indigenous people, and people with disabilities. Relative poverty and the resulting inequality in particular leave poor people vulnerable to torture. Criminalization of the poor, through laws targeting homelessness, sex work, or working in the informal economy, can lead to violent and arbitrary policing. Routine violence against poor and marginalized people is often not seen as torture, and its perpetrators justify the violence as a legitimate policing tactic; victims lack the resources or standing to seek redress.

Perpetrators
Since most research has focused on torture victims, less is known about the perpetrators of torture. Many torturers see their actions as serving a higher political or ideological goal that justifies torture as a legitimate means of protecting the state. Torture victims are often viewed by the perpetrators as serious threats and enemies of the state. There is a lack of evidence to support the common assumption that torturers are psychologically pathological; many perpetrators have an innate reluctance to employ violence, and rely on coping mechanisms, such as alcohol or drugs. Torturers who inflict more suffering than necessary to break the victim, or who act out of revenge or sexual gratification, may be rejected by peers or relieved of duty. Psychiatrist Pau Pérez-Sales finds that torturers act from a variety of motives such as ideological commitment, personal gain, group belonging, avoiding punishment, or avoiding guilt from previous acts of torture.

Although it is often assumed that torture is ordered from above at the highest levels of government, sociologist Jonathan Luke Austin argues that government authorization is a necessary but not sufficient condition for torture to occur, given that a specific order to torture rarely can be identified. In many cases, a combination of dispositional and situational effects lead a person to become a torturer. In most cases of systematic torture, the torturers were desensitized to violence by being exposed to physical or psychological abuse during training. Even when not explicitly ordered by the government to torture, perpetrators may feel peer pressure due to competitive masculinity. Elite and specialized police units are especially prone to torturing, perhaps because of their tight-knit nature and insulation from oversight. There is a lack of evidence for formal training of torturers, and perpetrators are thought to learn about torture techniques informally.

Torture can be a side effect of a broken criminal justice system in which underfunding, lack of judicial independence, or corruption undermines effective investigations and fair trials. In this context, people who cannot afford bribes are likely to become victims of torture. Understaffed or poorly trained police are more likely to resort to torture when interrogating suspects. In some countries, such as Kyrgyzstan, suspects are more likely to be tortured at the end of the month because of performance quotas.

Torturers rely on both active supporters and those who ignore it. Military, intelligence, psychology, medical, and legal professionals can all be complicit in torture. Incentives can favor the use of torture on an institutional or individual level, and some perpetrators are motivated by the prospect of career advancement. Bureaucracy can diffuse responsibility for torture and help perpetrators excuse their actions. Maintaining secrecy is often essential to maintaining a torture program, which can be accomplished in ways ranging from direct censorship, denial, or mislabeling torture as something else, to offshoring abuses to outside a state's territory. Along with official denials, torture is enabled by moral disengagement from the victims and impunity for the perpetrators—criminal prosecutions for torture are rare. Public demand for decisive action against crime or even support for torture against criminals can facilitate its use.

Once a torture program is begun, it is difficult or impossible to prevent it from escalating to more severe techniques and expanding to larger groups of victims, beyond what is originally intended or desired by decision-makers. Escalation of torture is especially difficult to contain in counterinsurgency operations. Torture and specific techniques spread between different countries, especially by soldiers returning home from overseas wars, although this process is poorly understood.

Purpose

Punishment

The use of torture for punishment dates back to antiquity, and is still employed in the 21st century.
A common practice in countries with dysfunctional justice systems or overcrowded prisons is for police to apprehend suspects, torture them, and release them without a charge. Such torture could be performed in a police station, the victim's home, or a public place. In South Africa, the police have been observed handing suspects over to vigilantes to be tortured. This type of extrajudicial violence is often carried out in public to deter others. It discriminatorily targets minorities and marginalized groups and may be supported by the public, especially if people do not trust the official justice system.

The classification of judicial corporal punishment as torture is internationally controversial, although it is explicitly prohibited under the Geneva Conventions. Some authors, such as John D. Bessler, argue that capital punishment is inherently a form of torture carried out for punishment. Executions may be carried out in brutal ways, such as stoning, death by burning, or dismemberment. The psychological harm of capital punishment is sometimes considered a form of psychological torture. Others do not consider corporal punishment with a fixed penalty to be torture, as it does not seek to break the victim's will.

Deterrence

Torture may also be used indiscriminately to terrorize people other than the direct victim or to deter opposition to the government. In the United States, torture was used to deter slaves from escaping or rebelling. Some defenders of judicial torture prior to its abolition saw it as a useful means of deterring crime; reformers argued that because torture was carried out in secret, it could not be an effective deterrent. In the twentieth century, well-known examples include the Khmer Rouge and anti-communist regimes in Latin America, who tortured and murdered their victims as part of forced disappearance. Regimes that are otherwise weak are more likely to resort to torture to deter opposition. Authoritarian regimes often resort to indiscriminate repression because they cannot accurately identify potential opponents. Many insurgencies lack the necessary infrastructure for a torture program and instead intimidate by killing. Research has found that state torture can extend the lifespan of terrorist organizations, increase incentives for insurgents to use violence, and radicalize the opposition. Researchers James Worrall and Victoria Penziner Hightower argue that the Syrian government's systematic and widespread use of torture during the Syrian civil war shows that it can be effective in instilling fear into certain groups or neighborhoods during a civil war. Another form of torture for deterrence is violence against migrants, as has been reported during pushbacks on the European Union's external borders.

Confession
 
Torture has been used throughout history to extract confessions from detainees. In 1764, Italian reformer Cesare Beccaria denounced torture as "a sure way to acquit robust scoundrels and to condemn weak but innocent people". Similar doubts about torture's effectiveness had been voiced for centuries previously, including by Aristotle. Despite the abolition of judicial torture, it sees continued use to elicit confessions, especially in judicial systems placing a high value on confessions in criminal matters. The use of torture to force suspects to confess is facilitated by laws allowing extensive pre-trial detention. Research has found that coercive interrogation is slightly more effective than cognitive interviewing for extracting a confession from a suspect, but presents a higher risk of false confession. Many torture victims will say whatever the torturer wants to hear to end the torture. Others who are guilty refuse to make a confession, especially if they believe that confessing will only bring more torture or punishment. Medieval justice systems attempted to counteract the risk of false confession under torture by requiring confessors to provide falsifiable details about the crime, and only allowing torture if there was already some evidence against the accused. In some countries, political opponents are tortured to force them to confess publicly as a form of state propaganda.

Interrogation

The use of torture to obtain information during interrogation accounts for a small percentage of worldwide torture cases; its use for obtaining confessions or intimidation is more common. Although interrogational torture has been used in conventional wars, it is even more common in asymmetric war or civil wars. The ticking time bomb scenario is extremely rare, if not impossible, but is cited to justify torture for interrogation. Fictional portrayals of torture as an effective interrogational method have fueled misconceptions that justify the use of torture. Experiments comparing torture with other interrogation methods cannot be performed for ethical and practical reasons, but most scholars of torture are skeptical about its efficacy in obtaining accurate information, although torture sometimes has obtained actionable intelligence. Interrogational torture can often shade into confessional torture or simply into entertainment, and some torturers do not distinguish between interrogation and confession.

Methods 

A wide variety of techniques have been used for torture. Nevertheless, there are a limited number of ways of inflicting pain while minimizing the risk of death. Survivors report that the exact method used is not significant. Most forms of torture include both physical and psychological elements and multiple methods are typically used on one person. Different methods of torture are popular in different countries. Low-tech methods are more commonly used than high-tech ones, and attempts to develop scientifically validated torture technology have failed. The prohibition of torture motivated a shift to methods that do not leave marks to aid in deniability and to deprive victims of legal redress. As they faced more pressure and scrutiny, democracies led the innovation in clean torture practices in the early twentieth century; such techniques diffused worldwide by the 1960s. Patterns of torture differ based on a torturer's time limits—for example, resulting from legal limits on pre-trial detention.

Beatings or blunt trauma are the most common form of physical torture. They may be either unsystematic or focused on a specific part of the body, as in falanga (the soles of the feet), repeated strikes against both ears, or shaking the detainee so that their head moves back and forth. Often, people are suspended in painful positions such as strappado or upside-down hanging in combination with beatings. People may also be subjected to stabbings or puncture wounds, have their nails removed, or body parts amputated. Burns are also common, especially cigarette burns, but other instruments are also employed, including hot metal, hot fluids, the sun, or acid. Forced ingestion of water, food, or other substances, or injections are also used as torture. Electric shocks are often used to torture, especially to avoid other methods that are more likely to leave scars. Asphyxiation, of which waterboarding is a form, inflicts torture on the victim by cutting off their air supply.

Psychological torture includes methods that involve no physical element as well as forcing a person to do something and physical attacks that ultimately target the mind. Death threats, mock execution, or being forced to witness the torture of another person are often reported to be subjectively worse than being physically tortured and are associated with severe sequelae. Other torture techniques include sleep deprivation, overcrowding or solitary confinement, withholding of food or water, sensory deprivation (such as hooding), exposure to extremes of light or noise (e.g., musical torture), humiliation (which can be based on sexuality or on the victim's religious or national identity), and the use of animals such as dogs to frighten or injure a prisoner. Positional torture works by forcing the person to adopt a stance, putting their weight on a few muscles, causing pain without leaving marks, for example standing or squatting for extended periods. Rape and sexual assault are universal torture methods and frequently instill a permanent sense of shame in the victim, and in some cultures humiliate their family and society. Cultural and individual differences affect how different torture methods are perceived by the victim. Many survivors from Arab or Muslim countries report that forced nudity is worse than beatings or isolation.

Effects

Torture is one of the most devastating experiences that a person can undergo. Torture aims to break the victim's will and destroy the victim's agency and personality. Torture survivor Jean Améry argued that it was "the most horrible event a human being can retain within himself" and that "whoever was tortured, stays tortured". Many torture victims, including Améry, later die by suicide. Survivors often experience social and financial problems. Circumstances such as housing insecurity, family separation, and the uncertainty of applying for asylum in a safe country strongly impact survivors' well-being.

Death is not an uncommon outcome of torture. Health consequences can include peripheral neuropathy, damage to teeth, rhabdomyolysis from extensive muscle damage, traumatic brain injury, sexually transmitted infection, and pregnancy from rape. Chronic pain and pain-related disability are commonly reported, but there is scant research into this effect or possible treatments. Common psychological problems affecting survivors include traumatic stress, anxiety, depression, and sleep disturbance. An average of 40 percent have long-term post-traumatic stress disorder (PTSD), a higher rate than for any other traumatic experience. Although the traditional view is that fear causes trauma, Pérez-Sales argues that loss of control explains trauma in torture survivors. As torture can be a form of political violence, not all survivors or rehabilitation experts support using medical categories to define their experience, and many survivors remain psychologically resilient.

Survivors of torture, their families, and others in the community may require long-term material, medical, psychological and social support. Most torture survivors do not disclose their status unless specifically asked by a healthcare provider. Psychological interventions have shown a statistically significant but clinically minor decrease in PTSD symptoms, but this decrease did not persist at follow-up. Other metrics, such as psychological distress or quality of life, showed no benefit or were not measured. Most studies have narrowly focused on PTSD symptoms, and there is a lack of research on integrated or patient-centric approaches to treatment.

Although there is less research on the effects of torture on perpetrators, they can experience moral injury or trauma symptoms similar to the victims, especially when they feel guilty about their actions. Torture has corrupting effects on the institutions and societies that perpetrate it. Torturers forget important investigative skills because torture can be an easier way than time-consuming police work to achieve high conviction rates, encouraging the continued and increased use of torture. Public disapproval of torture can harm the international reputation of countries that use it, strengthen and radicalize violent opposition to those states, and encourage adversaries to themselves use torture.

Public opinion
Studies have found that most people around the world oppose the use of torture in general. Some hold categorical views on torture; for others, torture's acceptability depends on the victim. Support for torture in specific cases is correlated with the belief that torture is effective and used in ticking time bomb cases. Women are more likely to oppose torture than men. Nonreligious people are less likely to support the use of torture than religious people, although for the latter group, increased religiosity increases opposition to torture. The personality traits of right-wing authoritarianism, social dominance orientation, and retributivism are correlated with higher support for torture; embrace of democratic values such as liberty and equality reduces support for torture. Public opinion is most favorable to torture, on average, in countries with low per capita income and high levels of state repression. Public opinion is an important constraint on the use of torture by states.

Prohibition

The stigma against torture as barbaric and uncivilized originated in the debates around its abolition. By the late nineteenth century, countries began to be condemned internationally for the use of torture. The ban on torture became part of the civilizing mission justifying colonial rule on the pretext of ending torture, despite the use of torture by colonial rulers themselves. The stigma was strengthened during the twentieth century in reaction to the use of torture by Nazi Germany and the Soviet Union. Shocked by Nazi atrocities during World War II, the United Nations drew up the 1948 Universal Declaration of Human Rights, which prohibited torture. Torture is criticized on the basis of all major ethical frameworks, including deontology, consequentialism, and virtue ethics. Some contemporary philosophers argue that torture is never morally acceptable; others propose exceptions to the general rule in real-life equivalents of the ticking time-bomb scenario.

Torture stimulated the creation of the human rights movement. In 1969, the Greek case was the first time that an international body—the European Commission on Human Rights—found that a state practiced torture. In the early 1970s, Amnesty International launched a global campaign against torture, exposing its widespread use despite international prohibition, and eventually leading to the United Nations Convention against Torture (CAT) in 1984. Successful civil society mobilizations against torture can prevent its use by governments that possess both motive and opportunity to use torture. Torture remains central to the human rights movement in the twenty-first century.

The prohibition of torture is a peremptory norm (jus cogens) in international law, meaning that it is forbidden for all states under all circumstances. Most jurists justify the absolute legal prohibition on torture based on its violation of human dignity. The CAT and its Optional Protocol focus on the prevention of torture, which was already prohibited in international human rights law under other treaties such as the International Covenant on Civil and Political Rights. The CAT specifies that torture must be a criminal offense under a country's laws, evidence obtained under torture may not be admitted in court, and deporting a person to another country where they are likely to face torture is forbidden. Even when it is illegal under national law, judges in many countries continue to admit evidence obtained under torture or ill treatment. A 2009 study found that 42 percent of states parties to the CAT continue to use torture systematically.

In international humanitarian law, which regulates the conduct of war, torture was first outlawed by the 1863 Lieber Code. Torture was prosecuted during the Nuremberg trials as a crime against humanity; it is recognized by both the 1949 Geneva Conventions and the 1998 Rome Statute of the International Criminal Court as a war crime. According to the Rome Statute, torture can also be a crime against humanity if committed as part of a systematic attack on a civilian population.

Prevention

Torture proliferates in situations of incommunicado detention. Because the risk of torture is highest directly after an arrest, procedural safeguards such as immediate access to a lawyer and notifying relatives of an arrest are the most effective ways of prevention. Visits by independent monitoring bodies to detention sites can also help reduce torture. Legal changes that are not implemented in practice have little effect on the incidence of torture. Legal changes can be particularly ineffective in places where the law has limited legitimacy or is routinely ignored.

Sociologically, torture operates as a subculture, frustrating prevention efforts because torturers can find a way around rules. Safeguards against torture in detention can be evaded by beating suspects during round-ups or on the way to the police station. General training of police to improve their ability to investigate crime has been more effective at reducing torture than specific training focused on human rights. Institutional police reforms have been effective when abuse is systematic. Political scientist Darius Rejali criticizes torture prevention research for not figuring out "what to do when people are bad; institutions broken, understaffed, and corrupt; and habitual serial violence is routine".

References

Sources

Books

Book chapters

Journal articles
 
 
 
 
 
 
 
 
 
 
 
 
 
 
 
 
 

 
Political violence
Human rights abuses
Philosophy of law
Ethically disputed judicial practices
Suffering
State crime